Shivajirao S. Jondhale College of Engineering (SSJCOE), is an engineering college located in Dombivli in Thane, Maharastra. SSJCOE is a private engineering college founded in 1994-95. The college has six departments:  Computer Engineering, Information technology, Chemical Engineering, Electronics and Telecommunications Engineering, Mechanical Engineering and Artificial Intelligence and Machine Learning.

College management

Intake of Students

Annual festivals

Odyssey

Odyssey is the annual cultural festival of the college held in the even semesters.

Colosseum

Colosseum is the annual Inter-Collegiate technical festival of the college held before Odyssey.

Kridaratna

College's annual Intra-college Sports Festival is named as 'Kridaratna'. It is held in the third week of January. 
Outdoor games like Overarm Cricket, Box Cricket, Football, Volleyball, Kabaddi, Tug of War & Indoor games like Carrom, Chess, Badminton, Table Tennis, Pool & Snooker are held.

Student representation

Notable alumni

See also
University of Mumbai
List of Mumbai Colleges

References

External links
Official Website
University of Mumbai

Engineering colleges in Maharashtra
Education in Kalyan-Dombivli
Affiliates of the University of Mumbai
Educational institutions established in 1994
1994 establishments in Maharashtra